James Burge McMillin (March 8, 1914 – August 22, 2005) was an American rower, who won Olympic gold at the 1936 Summer Olympics.

McMillin was born in Seattle and raised in the Queen Anne Hill area.

McMillin rowed in the University of Washington senior varsity eights which won US national Intercollegiate Rowing Association titles in 1936 and 1937. In 1936, he rowed to an Olympic gold medal in the five seat of the American boat in the eights competition. His role in the University of Washington eight and their Olympic victory is explored in the 2013 non-fiction book by author Daniel James Brown, The Boys in the Boat.

After graduating McMillin coached rowing at MIT and during WWII worked at MIT as a laboratory engineer on classified research. His later career was with Boeing in Seattle.

References

External links
 
 
 
 

1914 births
2005 deaths
Rowers from Seattle
Rowers at the 1936 Summer Olympics
Olympic gold medalists for the United States in rowing
American male rowers
Medalists at the 1936 Summer Olympics